The 2018–19 Melbourne Stars season is the eighth in the club's history. Coached by Stephen Fleming and captained by Glenn Maxwell, they competed in the BBL's 2018–19 season.

Season

Ladder

Regular season

Knockout stages

Semi-finals

Final

Players

Squad
The following is the Stars men's squad for the 2018–19 Big Bash League season as of 23 January 2019.

Personnel Changes

Incoming Players

Outgoing Players

Season statistics

Home attendance

Batting

Most runs

Full Table on Cricinfo
 Last updated: 17 February 2019

Highest scores

Full Table on Cricinfo
 Last updated: 17 February 2019

Best strike rates

Full Table on Cricinfo
 Last updated: 17 February 2019

Most sixes

Full Table on Cricinfo
 Last updated: 17 February 2019

References

External links
 Official website of the Melbourne Stars
 Official website of the Big Bash League

Melbourne Stars seasons